Russian Commercial and Industrial Bank v Comptoir d'Estcompte de Mulhouse [1925] AC 112 is a UK company law and banking case, concerning the authority of an officer of a company to carry out its actions, and a company's existence as a legal person.

Facts
The Russian Commercial and Industrial Bank's head office was in Petrograd in 1914. It had a branch in London. The branch manager had power of attorney to transact business and sue in the bank's name. By the Petrograd office's direction, the London branch deposited Brazilian and Chinese government bonds with a London bank, to be held as security for the French bank, Comptoir d'Estcompte, for an account opened by Comptoir d'Estcompte for Russian Commercial and Industrial Bank. In 1918, the Bolshevik government nationalised Russian banking, taking over all assets, share capital and management of private banking, and vesting them in a state bank, then the People's Bank, and then a government department. The London branch manager agreed with the French bank to pay off the amount of money it owed to the French bank, in return for the bonds. The money was paid, but the French bank refused to return the bonds.

Judgment

Court of Appeal
The Court of Appeal held by a majority that the French bank could keep the bonds. Bankes LJ and Scrutton LJ held that because of nationalisation, the Russian bank ceased to exist, and it therefore had no authority to direct the manager of the London branch to allow Russian Commercial and Industrial Bank to bring the action. Moreover, the French bank was not precluded by estoppel from relying on absence of authority as a defence.

Atkin LJ dissented. In the course of his judgment he wrote the following.

House of Lords
The House of Lords overturned the Court of Appeal and endorsed the dissenting judgment of Atkin LJ.

See also
UK company law

Notes

References

United Kingdom company case law
House of Lords cases
1925 in British law
1925 in case law